The yellowfin goatfish (Mulloidichthys vanicolensis) is a species of goatfish native to the Indian Ocean and the Pacific Ocean.

Description

The back is red-orange, while the flanks and the belly are whitish and the fins are yellow. The sides show a yellow longitudinal band. This species feeds on crustaceans or worms at night. By day, it forms large aggregations.

Distribution and habitat
These fish are widespread in the Indo-Pacific, from the Red Sea to Hawaii and the Tuamotus, north to Japan and to Lord Howe Island to the south. The yellowfin goatfish is a reef-associated species.

Parasites
Two genera of monogenean gill parasites, namely Volsellituba and Pennulituba, with a total of five different species, including V. orchidea, V. nabla, V. elephantina,  P. piratifalx, and P. cymansis,  have been reported from the yellowfin goatfish off New Caledonia, and were apparently found only on this species of fish. The apocreadiid digenean Homalometron moraveci is  found in the intestine.

References

External links
   Catalogue of Life
 

Mullidae
Fish of the Indian Ocean
Fish of the Pacific Ocean
Fish described in 1831
Taxa named by Achille Valenciennes